Orion  is a steel roller coaster located at Kings Island amusement park in Mason, Ohio. Manufactured by Bolliger & Mabillard, Orion became the seventh giga coaster in the world when it opened to the public on July 2, 2020. It is the largest investment in Kings Island's history, costing an estimated $30 million. It is situated in the Area 72 section of the park on a site formerly occupied by Firehawk.

History
In early 2019, Kings Island submitted construction blueprints to the City of Mason for approval. Dennis Speigel, a former park executive who helped with the transition from Coney Island to Kings Island in the early 1970s, speculated that the blueprints revealed a likely height estimate of at least , qualifying it as a giga coaster. The plans were approved on April 24, 2019. Cedar Fair also applied for national trademarks for the names Orion and Polaris as a marketing teaser tactic to keep enthusiasts guessing between the two. On August 15, 2019, Kings Island held an evening event open to both the media and public that officially announced the new coaster as Orion. The announcement also stated that the unofficial X-Base section of the park would be revamped and renamed Area 72 for the 2020 season.

In November 2019, Orion's train design was revealed at the annual International Association of Amusement Parks and Attractions (IAAPA) Amusement Expo in Orlando. Unlike previous train configurations from B&M that feature staggered, two-seat rows, Orion's trains were designed to seat four across in a straight line.

In February 2020, Orion successfully completed its first test run. It was originally scheduled to open on April 11, 2020, but due to the COVID-19 pandemic, the opening was postponed to July 2, 2020. A media preview event was held the previous day on July 1, 2020.

On December 30, 2020, it was announced that Orion won the 2020 "Best New Amusement Park Attraction" in the USA TODAY 10Best National Readers' Poll.

Ride experience

Queue
Guests enter the Fort Mason Research Compound by walking through the entrance building, which was originally the Firehawk photo booth. The line starts with a zig-zag portion followed by a staircase. This leads to a large area with switchbacks and winding paths. There are some posters that are shown on a fence. A blue concrete pylon can be spotted in the area with a stamp that reads Radium XL-200, a reference to Magnum XL-200 at Cedar Point. The same pylons are seen near the Meteor Canteen restaurant. The stamps on these pylons read Metamorphic-VTBC, a reference to Volcano: The Blast Coaster at Kings Dominion, Igneous-12E, a reference to Disaster Transport at Cedar Point and Sedimentary-325, a reference to Fury 325 at Carowinds. Two buildings are seen in the queue that are labeled Outpost 87 and Outpost 07. Guests enter a research office, where a video is played on the screens. The area contains several lockers and office desks. A bulletin board can be found with references to other attractions, including Zodiac, Skylab, Vortex and Invertigo. Guests exit the research office and head into the station, where they board the ride.

Layout
Upon leaving the station, the train climbs a  chain lift hill. Upon reaching the peak, it drops , reaching . The train speeds through a  banked airtime hill and a  horseshoe. It makes its way through a  airtime hill. This is followed by a  airtime hill with a trim brake. The train zooms through a  spiral before passing the on-ride camera. Following this, the train slows down on the brake run, makes a left turn and returns to the station.

References

External links
 

Roller coasters operated by Cedar Fair
Gigacoasters
Kings Island
Hypercoasters manufactured by Bolliger & Mabillard